Events from the year 1524 in France

Incumbents
 Monarch – Francis I

Events
Formation of the Franco-Polish alliance
Italian campaign of 1524–25

Births
 
17 February – Charles, Cardinal of Lorraine (died 1574)
11 September – Pierre de Ronsard, poet (died 1585)

Full date missing
Armand de Gontaut, baron de Biron, soldier (died 1592).
Gilles de Noailles, diplomat (died 1600)

Deaths
30 April – Pierre Terrail, seigneur de Bayard, soldier (born 1473)
20 July – Claude of France, Queen of France, the first wife of Francis I (born 1499).
18 September – Charlotte of France, princess (born 1516)

Full date missing
Étienne de Poncher, prelate and diplomat (born 1446)

See also

References

1520s in France